Leucanthemum paludosum (formerly Chrysanthemum paludosum and Mauranthemum paludosum), commonly known as creeping daisy or mini marguerite, is a perennial plant of the family Asteraceae.

Description
A perennial, the plant height is about 15 cm to 25 cm. It is a dwarf and is an ornamental plant. Also grown as a cool season annual plant, the flower's inflorescences are small flower heads with white ligules arranged around the yellow centre. The flowers open when the sun shines on them.

Distribution
The place of origin is around northern Africa in Algeria. It is widely distributed along the Mediterranean coast.

Cultivation
Tolerant of many soils and requiring full sun, it is usually planted in rock gardens and border fronts, and can be ideal for all sorts of containers.

See also
Argyranthemum, similar looking plant of different genus or 'true daisies'

References

External links
  Leucanthemum paludosum
  Leucanthemum paludosum (Poir.) Pomel

paludosum
Flora of Algeria
Flora of Africa